John Terence Harkin (born 14 September 1941) is a Northern Irish former professional footballer who played as a forward. He scored 125 goals in 260 league games in nine seasons in the Football League. He also scored 66 goals in 142 games in the League of Ireland, and scored five goals in 11 North American Soccer League games. At international level, he made five appearances scoring two goals for the Northern Ireland national team.

He began his career with Derry City and Coleraine, before winning a £2,000 move to Port Vale in September 1962. He was sold on to Crewe Alexandra for £3,000 in June 1964, and scored a club record 35 goals in 1964–65. He moved on to Cardiff City in August 1965, before switching to Notts County the following year. He was sold on to Southport for £2,000 the next year, before being transferred to Shrewsbury Town in March 1969. He returned to Ireland in 1971 to play for Finn Harps. He spent eight years with the club, and won the FAI Cup in 1974, and helped the "Harps" to finish second in the League of Ireland in 1972–73, 1975–76, and 1977–78. In summer 1973, he played on loan for Canadian club Toronto Metros. He ended his career in 1980, following a brief spell at Dundalk.

Club career
A prolific goalscorer throughout his career, Harkin started out as a youth with Derry City before making his name with Bertie Peacock's Coleraine. He transferred to Norman Low's Port Vale for a £2,000 fee in September 1962. He opened his account for the "Valiants" with a brace in a 5–1 win over Southend United at Vale Park on 24 September. He finished the 1962–63 season with 10 goals in 17 Third Division, as new boss Freddie Steele took the club to within one place of automatic promotion. In 1963–64, Harkin managed only two goals in eleven games, both against Southend.

A close-season £3,000 transfer to Jimmy McGuigan's Crewe Alexandra in June 1964 brought an improvement to Harkin's league opportunities. He scored 35 times (a seasonal record for a Crewe player) in the Fourth Division in 1964–65, including a four-goal performance in a 6–2 win over Barrow. This form brought the attentions of higher-league clubs, and new Port Vale manager Jackie Mudie tried to re-sign Harkin towards the end of the season, but he remained at Gresty Road.

In August 1965, Cardiff City manager Jimmy Scoular took Harkin into the Second Division. An explosive start to his Ninian Park career saw a debut goal in a 2–1 defeat by Derby County, and a total of seven in his first eight games, before his form dipped, and goals dried up. The "Bluebirds" narrowly avoided relegation in 1965–66. Thereafter Harkin's first-team opportunities were sporadic, and in September 1966 both club and player decided to part ways.

A "no-nonsense" striker, strong in the air and possessing a powerful shot with either foot, Harkin found himself back in the Fourth Division with Notts County. An explosive start at Meadow Lane brought Harkin seven goals by mid-November, before his form slightly dipped. At the end of 1966–67, the "Magpies" finished just above the re-election positions, and accepted a £2,000 bid for Harkin from Southport, newly promoted to the Third Division.

At that time, Southport were managed by Billy Bingham, and although he left mid-season to manage Plymouth Argyle, he clearly remembered Harkin for the other post he had also taken that season, part-time manager of Northern Ireland. His 21 league goals in 1967–68 helped the "Sandgrounders" to mid-table respectability, and an appearance in the FA Cup third round, where they lost narrowly, 1–0, to First Division giants, Everton.

In March 1969, cash-strapped Southport manager Don McEvoy was forced to sell one of his prize assets, as Harkin joining struggling Third Division rivals, Shrewsbury Town. Harkin's eight goals in seventeen appearances helped drag the "Shrews" to safety in 1968–69. Harkin remained a regular goalscorer at Gay Meadow in 1969–70 through to the end of the 1970–71 season, when he moved back home to sign for Donegal club, Finn Harps.

Harkin helped the "Harps" to the most successful period in their history when he tied (with Waterford's Alfie Hale) in the League of Ireland in 1972–73 on a league-leading tally of 20 goals. He claimed an FAI Cup winners' medal the following year (the club's only ever major trophy win). The "Harps" did regularly challenge for the League championship, and finished as runners-up in 1972–73, 1975–76, and 1977–78. They also competed in Europe on a regular basis, and Harkin scored in two legs against Aberdeen in the 1973–74 UEFA Cup. He finished as the League of Ireland's joint top-scorer (with Alfie Hale) in the 1972–73 season, with 20 goals. Harkin's 82 league and cup goals leaves him in the club's top-five all-time goalscorers.

Harkin spent the summer of 1973 playing in the North American Soccer League, helping the Toronto Metros to the play-offs with nine goals and five assists (15 points in MVP terms) in eleven games. He finished his senior career as a 38-year-old with Dundalk, later becoming a director at Derry City.

International career
It was during his debut season in England that Harkin won his first senior representative honour, leading the line for Northern Ireland under-23's in a 5–1 defeat by Wales at Vetch Field, Swansea, in February 1963.

His first full cap for Northern Ireland senior team came in 1968. On 11 December 1968, they faced Turkey at BJK İnönü Stadium in Istanbul in qualification for the 1970 FIFA World Cup, and Harkin bagged a brace in a 3–0 win. The final two caps of Harkin's international career were won in Moscow and Seville, both games resulting in defeats.

Career statistics

Club

International

Honours
Finn Harps
FAI Cup: 1974

References

1941 births
Living people
Sportspeople from Derry (city)
Association footballers from Northern Ireland
Northern Ireland international footballers
Association football forwards
Derry City F.C. players
Coleraine F.C. players
Port Vale F.C. players
Crewe Alexandra F.C. players
Cardiff City F.C. players
Notts County F.C. players
Southport F.C. players
Shrewsbury Town F.C. players
Expatriate association footballers from Northern Ireland
Expatriate association footballers in the Republic of Ireland
Expatriates from Northern Ireland in the Republic of Ireland
Finn Harps F.C. players
Expatriate soccer players in Canada
Expatriate sportspeople from Northern Ireland in Canada
Toronto Blizzard (1971–1984) players
Dundalk F.C. players
NIFL Premiership players
English Football League players
League of Ireland players
North American Soccer League (1968–1984) players